The CARMENES survey (Calar Alto high-Resolution search for M-dwarfs with Exoearths with Near-infrared and optical Échelle Spectrographs) is a project to examine approximately 300 M-dwarf stars for signs of exoplanets with the CARMENES instrument on the Spanish Calar Alto's 3.5m telescope. 

Operating since 2016, it aims to find Earth-sized exoplanets around 2  (Earth masses) using Doppler spectroscopy (also called the radial velocity method). More than 20 exoplanets have been found through CARMENES, among them Teegarden b, considered one of the most potentially habitable exoplanets. Another potentially habitable planet found is GJ 357 d.

Discoveries

See also 
List of exoplanet search projects

References 

Astronomical surveys